This is a list of Australian environmental books:

Global Spin: The Corporate Assault on Environmentalism (1997), by Sharon Beder
Human Ecology, Human Economy: Ideas for an Ecologically Sustainable Future (1997), edited by Mark Diesendorf and Clive Hamilton
Running from the Storm: The Development of Climate Change Policy in Australia (2001), by Clive Hamilton
A Big Fix: Radical Solutions for Australia's Environmental Crisis (2005), by Ian Lowe
Living in the Hothouse: How Global Warming Affects Australia (2005), by Ian Lowe
The Weather Makers (2005), by Tim Flannery
Environmental Principles and Policies (2006), by Sharon Beder
Chasing Kangaroos (2007), by Tim Flannery
Greenhouse Solutions with Sustainable Energy (2007), by Mark Diesendorf
High and Dry: John Howard, Climate Change and the Selling of Australia's Future (2007), by Guy Pearse
Maralinga: Australia’s Nuclear Waste Cover-up (2007), by Alan Parkinson
Reaction Time: Climate Change and the Nuclear Option (2007), by Ian Lowe
Scorcher: The Dirty Politics of Climate Change (2007), by Clive Hamilton
Climate Code Red: The Case for Emergency Action (2008), by David Spratt and Philip Sutton
Now or Never: A Sustainable Future for Australia? (2008), by Tim Flannery
Quarry Vision: Coal, Climate Change and the End of the Resources Boom (2009), by Guy Pearse
Requiem for a Species (2010), by Clive Hamilton

See also
List of environmental books
List of environmental issues

Australian non-fiction books

Environmental books
Australian books
Books